This list of Dutch Israelis includes Israeli citizens or residents who were born in the Netherlands or are of Dutch descent.

Arts 
 Helen Berman - painter (Dutch-born)
 Hannah Yakin - painter (Dutch-born)

Business 
 Dov Frohman - director-general of Intel Israel, inventor of the EPROM (Dutch-born)

Civil service 
 Ya'akov Arnon - director-general of the Israeli ministry of Finance (Dutch-born)

Music 
 Keren Ann - recording artist, singer-songwriter and producer	
 Carmit Bachar - singer (American-born, of mixed Dutch-Israeli descent, with some Indonesian, Jewish, and Chinese roots)
 Bart Berman - pianist and composer (Dutch-born)

Politics 
 Ophir Pines-Paz - Knesset member and former cabinet minister (was a citizen of the Netherlands; Dutch-born father)

Science 
 Martin van Creveld - military historian
 Chaim Elata - professor emeritus of mechanical engineering and President of Ben-Gurion University of the Negev, and Chairman of the Israel Public Utility Authority for Electricity
 Manfred Gerstenfeld - political scientist

Sports 
 Daniël de Ridder - soccer player
 Levie Van Ouwerkerk - soccer player

Theatre 
 Nissan Nativ - Israeli actor and theater educator (fled Germany to Amsterdam, then made aliyah)

See also  
 Israel–Netherlands relations
 List of Dutch Jews

References

Israel
 
Israel–Netherlands relations